May the Devil Take You is a 2018 Indonesian horror film written and directed by Timo Tjahjanto.The story follows Alfie (Chelsea Islan) who, when trying to find answers to her father's (Ray Sahetapy) mysterious illness, visits his old house and finds out events from his past.

The film was internationally released by Netflix on 9 August 2018 and premiered at the 75th Venice International Film Festival on 3 September 2018. A sequel, May the Devil Take You Too, was released in 2020.

Plot
Lesmana Wijaya participates in a satanic ritual to gain wealth. His success is marked with news clippings that record his rise to fame, the suicide of his first wife Intan, and his marriage to the retired actress Laksmi before showing that he is now facing bankruptcy. Lesmana's estranged daughter Alfie resents him for marrying Laksmi while bearing no ill will towards her step-siblings Ruben, Maya, and Nara. After not seeing him for many years, Alfie is informed that Lesmana has been hospitalized due to a horrific and mysterious illness and has fallen into a coma. At the hospital Alfie learns that Laksmi will be searching the abandoned family villa for valuables and experiences supernatural activity. 

Later at the villa Ruben discovers and opens a sealed basement door at the demand of his mother, who believes the room may contain valuables. This instead unleashes a supernatural presence that simultaneously attacks Lesmana in his hospital bed and possesses Laksmi, who then attacks Maya. An attempt by Alfie to take Maya to medical treatment is unsuccessful and only results in a delirious Maya fleeing into the forest. Maya is attacked by her mother and manages to successfully defeat her, only to succumb to the presence. Under its influence she murders Ruben's girlfriend Lily, who had answered his pleas for rescue. Meanwhile Alfie and Ruben discover how Lesmana gained his wealth, the cost of which were the souls of those around him. Alfie also fully recalls the moment of her mother's death, realizing that it was due to the demonic pact and not suicide. The presence also continues to torment Alfie, Ruben, and Nara. 

Maya returns to the villa, where she discovers a set of dolls made with the hair of each respective family member just before the presence invites her to become a satanic priestess. Now fully under its sway, she ultimately attacks her siblings and pleads with Ruben to join her, as the devil only wants the souls of Alfie and Nara. He refuses, prompting her to murder Ruben by dismembering a doll made of his hair. Alfie is taken downstairs, where she sees a flashback of her father betraying and killing the satanic priestess. Before she dies, she rips and swallows some of Lesmana's hair, cursing him with the mysterious illness and swearing vengeance. He then buries her under the cellar floor and seals off the room. While she is witnessing this Maya enters the room. Realizing that the presence is actually the priestess and that it is in control of Maya's body, Alfie makes an unsuccessful entreaty to Maya's spirit. The priestess mocks Alfie, claiming that Maya has fully become one with her, before using Alfie's doll to torture her. Alfie then takes Maya's hair doll and burns it in the fire, resulting in Maya's death. Alfie then digs up the body of the priestess in order to burn the chunk of Lesmana's hair that she swallowed. Alfie then sees the priestess, who drags her down underground. Alfie awakens in a pit of mud, where she is entwined in hair. She manages to free herself but is unable to climb out of the pit. Just as she has given up, Alfie hears her mother's voice and sees her hand. She uses it to climb out of the pit, discovering that the hand actually belongs to Nara. Now free, the pair escape the villa. Back in the home, the camera pans over the villa's interior and shows the dark doorway of the basement.

Cast 
 Chelsea Islan as Alfie Wijaya: Lesmana and Intan's daughter, Laksmi's step-daughter, Maya and Ruben's step-sister, Nara's half-sister.
 Nicole Rossi as young Alfie
 Pevita Pearce as Maya Wijaya: Laksmi's daughter, Alfie's step-sister, Ruben's elder sister, Nara's half-sister.
 Karina Suwandi as Laksmi Surya: Alfie's step-mother, Lesmana's second wife, Maya, Ruben and Nara's mother, a retired actress.
 Ray Sahetapy as Lesmana Wijaya: Alfie and Nara's father, Intan and Laksmi's husband, Maya and Ruben's step-father, an entrepreneur
 Samo Rafael as Ruben Wijaya: Alfie's step-brother, Laksmi's son, Maya's brother, Nara's half-brother.
 Ruth Marini as The Priestess
 Daniel Ekapurta as Berserker Priestess
 Hadijah Shahab as Nara Wijaya: Alfie, Maya and Ruben's half-sister, Laksmi and Lesmana's daughter.
 Clara Bernadeth as Lily, Ruben's girlfriend.
 Kinaryosih as Intan Wijaya: Alfie's mother and Lesmana's first wife who was killed by the Devil.
 Abimana Aryasatya as the voice of the Devil

Release
It was released on August 9, 2018 on Netflix streaming.

Critical reception
On Rotten Tomatoes, the film received  positive aggregate rating, based on  reviews.

Sequels 
A sequel entitled May the Devil Take You Too was released in Indonesia on February 27, 2020 theatrically and was followed up with a digital release to Disney+ Hotstar. It was later given an American release through Shudder. Tjahjanto has announced plans to release a third film in the series.

References

External links 
 
 
 

2018 films
2018 horror films
2010s psychological horror films
Demons in film
The Devil in film
Films about exorcism
Fiction about monsters
Indonesian horror films
2010s Indonesian-language films
Indonesian-language Netflix original films